Vurrusjøen is a lake in Engerdal Municipality in Innlandet county, Norway. The  lake lies immediately west of the border with Sweden and the village of Drevsjø sits on the west end of the lake. The Swedish lake Fløtningsjøen lies just east of this lake.

See also
List of lakes in Norway

References

Engerdal
Lakes of Innlandet